The Electric Aircraft Corporation ElectraFlyer Trike is an ultralight trike fitted with an electric motor, instead of a traditional gasoline engine.

Design and development
The Electraflyer Trike is built to comply with Federal Aviation Regulations, part 103. The standard ElectraFlyer is equipped with a 5.6—kWh Lithium-ion polymer battery which powers an  Electric Aircraft Corporation Electra 1 electric motor — which can be optionally upgraded to a  motor.  Depending on the number of battery packs mounted, the aircraft can fly for between one and two hours before it must be recharged for 5–6 hours using a standard 120 volt AC outlet.  Charging time can be reduced to 2 hours using a 240 volt outlet.

It was awarded the Grand Champion Ultralight at the 2007 EAA AirVenture Oshkosh Fly-In.

References

External links
ElectraFlyer website archives on Archive.org

Ultralight aircraft
Homebuilt aircraft
2000s United States ultralight aircraft
Ultralight trikes
Single-engined pusher aircraft
Electric aircraft
Trike